Servando Carrasco (born August 13, 1988) is an American professional soccer player who plays as a defensive midfielder.

Career
Carrasco spent his childhood living in Tijuana, Mexico, and attended St. Augustine High School in San Diego, California. Until the age of 19, he played for his high school and San Diego Surf Soccer Club, one of the most competitive soccer clubs in California.  During that time, he was recognized as Western League Player of the Year, CIF Player of the Year, and the San Diego Union-Tribune All-County Player of the Year. He also participated in the Olympic Development Program and the Premier Development Program.

College
In 2007, Carrasco accepted a scholarship at the University of California, Berkeley.  During his first year, Carrasco recorded seven points on two goals and three assists.  He scored his second goal of the season against Washington in the opening minutes of the game; he added an insurance goal for Cal against San Diego increasing the Bears' lead to 2–0; and he earned several assists against UCLA, Stanford and University of San Francisco.

In 2008, Carrasco was named All-Pac-10 second team and Pac-10 All-Academic second-team.  He started in all but one game and scored three goals for the year, tying him for second best on the team. He was one of two Cal players to have seven assists during the season, including one assist on the game-winning goal against Oregon State University.

In 2009, despite suffering an ankle injury that sidelined him for a number of games, Carrasco still earned a second straight All-Pac-10 second-team selection and a Pac-10 All-Academic honorable mention. He had one goal.

In 2010, Carrasco was senior co-captain of the Berkeley squad with good friend A. J. Soares, a defender with Viking FK. He was named NSCAA Third Team Far West Region, First Team All-Pac-10, Third Team Pac-10 All American, and Pac-10 All-Academic honorable mention. Carrasco scored seven goals and had three assists.

Throughout his 4 years at UC Berkeley, he scored 13 goals.

Professional
On January 13, 2011, Carrasco was drafted in the second round (27th overall) of the 2011 MLS SuperDraft by Seattle Sounders FC. He signed with Seattle on March 2, 2011, and made his debut on March 19, in a game against the New York Red Bulls.

Carrasco scored his first career goal for Seattle on June 8, 2013, on a penalty kick in a 3–2 win against Vancouver Whitecaps FC.
Carrasco was traded to the Houston Dynamo from Seattle in exchange for Adam Moffat on September 13, 2013.  Carrasco was then traded from the Houston to Sporting Kansas City for the 30th pick in the 2015 MLS SuperDraft. On July 20, 2015, Carrasco was traded to Orlando City SC in exchange for midfielder Amobi Okugo. On April 9, 2017, Carrasco scored his first goal for Orlando and second overall career goal when he headed home from a corner in a 1–0 win v New York Red Bulls.

At the end of the 2017 season Carrasco entered the 2017 MLS Re-Entry Draft after Orlando City declined his contract option. On December 21, 2017, he was selected by LA Galaxy in Stage Two of the draft. He signed with the club on January 11, 2018. After his contract was declined at the end of the 2019 season, Carrasco signed with Fort Lauderdale CF in USL League One.

Personal life
While born in the United States, Carrasco spent most of his early childhood growing up in the nearby Mexican city of Tijuana. When he was seven, his family moved back to the United States. His mother, Gloria, is a two-time survivor of breast cancer. On December 31, 2014, Carrasco married Alex Morgan, a professional soccer player for the United States Women's National Team. The couple's first child, Charlie Elena Carrasco, was born on May 7, 2020.

Career statistics

References

External links
 
 Cal Golden Bears bio

1988 births
Living people
American soccer players
American sportspeople of Mexican descent
Association football midfielders
California Golden Bears men's soccer players
Houston Dynamo FC players
LA Galaxy players
Inter Miami CF II players
Major League Soccer players
Orlando City SC players
Seattle Sounders FC draft picks
Seattle Sounders FC players
Soccer players from San Diego
Sporting Kansas City players